United States women's national bandy team represent the United States in the Women's Bandy World Championship. The team has participated in all Bandy World Championships for women since the first tournament in 2004.

See also
Bandy
Rink bandy
Women's Bandy World Championship
Great Britain women's national bandy team
Sweden women's national bandy team
Russia women's national bandy team
Finland women's national bandy team
Norway women's national bandy team
Switzerland women's national bandy team
China women's national bandy team
Canada women's national bandy team
Hungary women's national bandy team
Soviet Union women's national bandy team

References

Bandy in the United States
National bandy teams
Bandy